La Loge ('The Theatre Box') is an 1874 oil painting by Pierre-Auguste Renoir. It is part of the collection at the Courtauld Institute of Art in London.

The painting depicts a young couple in a box at the Paris theatre. The woman was modelled by Nini Lopez, Renoir's new model who would feature in fourteen of his paintings over the next few years. The man was his brother Edmond, a journalist and art critic. Going to the theatre was as much about being seen as watching the performance and whilst the woman is making her presence obvious, her companion is scanning the audience through his opera-glasses.

La Loge was included in the Salon in 1874, where reaction was mixed. It was subsequently shown in London in an exhibition organised by his dealer Paul Durand-Ruel, making it one of the earliest Impressionist paintings to be shown in England, but did not sell at either exhibition. It was bought the following year by the dealer ‘Père’ Martin for 425 francs.

References

1874 paintings
Paintings by Pierre-Auguste Renoir
Paintings in the collection of the Courtauld Institute of Art